Demissie or Demisse (Amharic: ደመሰ) is a male given name of Ethiopian origin that may refer to:

Demissie Tsige, Ethiopian author and journalist
Demissie Wolde (born 1937), Ethiopian former marathon runner
Debebe Demisse (born 1968), Ethiopian former cross country runner

Amharic-language names